Brace Brook is a tributary of the Lackawanna River in Wayne County and Susquehanna County, in Pennsylvania, in the United States. The stream is not designated as impaired. It drains a portion of the Moosic Mountains. The surficial geology in its vicinity consists of alluvium, surface mining land, coal dumps, fill, Wisconsinan Till, and bedrock containing sandstone and shale. A reservoir known as the Brace Brook Reservoir is in the watershed. The stream's drainage basin is designated as a Coldwater Fishery and a Migratory Fishery.

Course
Brace Brook begins on a hill in Mount Pleasant Township, Wayne County, not far from the border Wayne County/Susquehanna County line. It flows south-southeast and south for several tenths of a mile through a valley near Brace Brook Road before entering Clinton Township. The stream then flows south-southeast for several tenths of a mile before entering another valley and receiving an unnamed tributary from the left. It then turns west-southwest for several hundred feet before turning south-southeast and passing through the Brace Brook Reservoir. A short distance downstream of that reservoir, the stream turns south for several tenths of a mile. It then turns southwest for several tenths of a mile before turning south and then west-southwest. After a short distance, the stream exits Clinton Township and Wayne County and enters Forest City, in Susquehanna County. At this point, it immediately reaches its confluence with the Lackawanna River.

Brace Brook joins the Lackawanna River  upriver of its mouth.

Hydrology
Brace Brook is not designated as an impaired stream. In the early 1900s, the water quality in a reach of the watershed was described as "satisfactory".

Geography and geology

Brace Brook drains a portion of the western side of the Moosic Mountain Ridge. Part of the watershed is specifically located on Browndale Mountain, a section of the Moosic Mountains. The stream flows through a "spectacular" ravine downstream of the Brace Brook Reservoir. There is an above-ground water pipeline in the vicinity of Brace Brook.

Part of the watershed of Brace Brook is located upstream of the coal measures. However, there are culm piles at the stream's mouth. The surficial geology along the stream in its lower reaches mainly consists of alluvium, surface mining land, coal dumps, and fill. There are also areas of a glacial or resedimented till known as Wisconsinan Till nearby, and also bedrock consisting of sandstone and shale. Further upstream, the surficial geology in the stream's vicinity mainly consists of Wisconsinan Till, but there are patches of alluvium and peat bogs near the Brace Brook Reservoir. Bedrock consisting of sandstone and shale lines the sides of the stream's valley in its middle reaches.

Watershed
The stream is entirely within the United States Geological Survey quadrangle of Forest City.

Brace Brook is a second-order stream.

The Brace Brook Reservoir, which is on Brace Brook, is used as an emergency water supply for Forest City by the Pennsylvania American Water Company.

History and recreation
Brace Brook was entered into the Geographic Names Information System on August 2, 1979. Its identifier in the Geographic Names Information System is 1170106.

A reservoir on Brace Brook supplied Forest City with water via gravity as early as the early 1900s. There are a number of old concrete structures on Brace Brook. Additionally, a water filtration plant is located to the south of the stream's mouth.

At the Pennsylvania Fish and Boat Commission meeting on April 15 and 16, 2013, the commission considered adding Brace Brook and a number of other streams to its list of wild trout streams.

There are unofficial walking paths along the side of the ravine through which Brace Brook flows. Additionally, the stream crosses the O&W Rail Trail via a culvert.

Biology
The drainage basin of Brace Brook is designated as a Coldwater Fishery and a Migratory Fishery. The stream is designated by the Pennsylvania Fish and Boat Commission as Class A Wild Trout Waters for brook trout form its headwaters downstream to the inflow of the Brace Brook Reservoir.

See also
Meredith Brook, next tributary of the Lackawanna River going downriver
East Branch Lackawanna River, next tributary of the Lackawanna River going upriver
West Branch Lackawanna River, next tributary of the Lackawanna River going upriver
List of rivers of Pennsylvania
List of tributaries of the Lackawanna River

References

Rivers of Wayne County, Pennsylvania
Rivers of Susquehanna County, Pennsylvania
Tributaries of the Lackawanna River
Rivers of Pennsylvania